Robert Balfour, 5th Lord Balfour of Burleigh (buried 20 March 1757) was a Jacobite from the Burleigh family of the county of Kinross, remembered chiefly for a crime of passion that brought devastation to his family.

Biography
Balfour, when a youth fell in love with a woman far inferior in rank, much to the annoyance of the family. He was sent to travel abroad in the hope that he would forget his attachment. Before he set out he declared to his lady-love that if in his absence she married he would kill her husband. Notwithstanding the threat, she did marry a Henry Stenhouse, schoolmaster at Inverkeithing, acquainting him beforehand of the hazard.

On Balfour's return his first inquiry was after the girl. On being informed of her marriage, on 9 April 1707 he proceeded on horseback with two attendants directly to the school at Inverkeithing, called Stenhouse out, deliberately shot him, wounding him in the shoulder, and quietly returned to Burleigh. The schoolmaster lingered twelve days, and then died. Balfour was tried for the murder in the High Court of Justiciary on 4 August 1709. The defence was ingenious, but inadequate; Balfour argued there had been no intent to kill, that the wound was merely to the arm and hence plainly designed to frighten or correct, and that the deceased had lived for several days after the being shot before dying of a 'fretful temper'. Balfour was found guilty, and sentenced to be beheaded on 6 January 1709-10. But a few days prior to this he escaped from the Edinburgh Tolbooth by exchanging clothes with his sister, who resembled him. He skulked for some time in the neighbourhood of Burleigh, and is reputed to have concealed himself in a hollowed ash-tree afterwards named "Burleigh's Hole".

On the death of his father, in 1713, the title devolved on him. His next appearance was at the meeting of Jacobites at Lochmaben, 29 May 1714, when the Pretender's health was drunk, Lord Burleigh denouncing damnation against all who would not drink it. He engaged in the rebellion of 1715. For this he was in the same year attainted by Act of Parliament, and his estates, worth £697 per annum, were forfeited to the crown.

Balfour's story is retold by writer Daniel Defoe in his 1724 Tour thro' the Whole Island of Great Britain as part of the description of the town of Inverkeithing. Defoe asserts that the tragical story had been much talked about in England at the time.

Balfour died, without issue, in 1757 and was buried at Greyfriars Kirkyard, Edinburgh. The attainder was reversed in 1869 in favour of Alexander Bruce, 6th Lord Balfour of Burleigh.

References

Year of birth missing
Date of birth unknown
1757 deaths
Scottish Jacobites
18th-century Scottish people
People convicted of murder by Scotland
People of the Jacobite rising of 1715
Scottish people convicted of murder
Scottish prisoners sentenced to death
Prisoners sentenced to death by Scotland
Scottish escapees
Escapees from Scottish detention
Robert, 5th Lord Balfour
Lords Balfour of Burleigh